Labrador (formerly known as Grand Falls—White Bay—Labrador and Grand Falls—White Bay) is a federal electoral district in Newfoundland and Labrador, Canada, that has been represented in the House of Commons of Canada since 1949.

The riding covers all of Labrador and with just 26,000 people located in the riding it is the least populous in Canada. From 2005 to 2011, the riding was represented by Liberal MP Todd Russell.  He was defeated by Conservative Peter Penashue in the 2011 federal election. Following allegations of irregularities in his campaign spending, Penashue announced on March 14, 2013 that he would resign his seat and run again as a candidate in a new by-election.  Penashue subsequently lost the by-election to Liberal candidate Yvonne Jones. Jones was re-elected in the 2015, 2019, and 2021 federal elections. The riding is viewed as a Liberal stronghold.

The riding contains a large indigenous population, including the Inuit self-governing territory of Nunatsiavut, as well as two Innu reserves Sheshatshiu and Natuashish. The Voisey's Bay nickel mine, near Nain, is also in the riding.

All six indigenous communities on the North Coast are inaccessible by road and may be reached only by air or sea.

Demographics

This riding is the least populous in Canada. Citing the region's highly distinct identity and seeing it as a community of interest they have the legal duty to respect, successive electoral boundary commissions have used their ability to make exceptions to the general electoral quotient to maintain Labrador as a separate riding.

In earlier representation orders, it was joined with communities on the Great Northern Peninsula of the island of Newfoundland.

Ethnic groups: 65.1% White, 34.9% Native Canadian 
Languages (2016): 86.4% English, 5.6% Innu, 2.3% Naskapi, 1.5% French, 1.4% Inuktitut, 1.3% Tagalog, 0.1% German, 0.1% Panjabi, 0.1% Spanish
Religions: 67.4% Protestant, 28.4% Catholic, 3.4% No affiliation 
Average income: $27 138

Geography
The district includes all of Labrador, including Belle Isle, North and South Aulatsivik Island.

The neighbouring ridings are Nunavut, Abitibi—Baie-James—Nunavik—Eeyou, Manicouagan, and Long Range Mountains.

According to Elections Canada, the boundaries of this riding for the 39th General Election (2006) are:

 "Consisting of all that part of the Province of Newfoundland and Labrador known as Labrador, including Belle Isle."

The 2012 federal electoral boundaries redistribution concluded that the electoral boundaries of Labrador should be preserved with no boundary changes for future elections.

See the map of the Labrador riding.

History

The electoral district was created in 1949 upon the admission of Newfoundland to Canada. Between 1949 and 1988, this district was attached to the Island of Newfoundland, where more than half of its electorate resided. Liberal MP Bill Rompkey held the seat from 1972 till his appointment to the Senate of Canada in 1995. Lawrence D. O'Brien was later elected in a by-election and held the district until his death in 2004.

A by-election was held on May 24, 2005, with the result tipping the balance of the evenly split 38th Parliament. The Liberal candidate, Todd Russell, who was heavily favoured, ended up winning, but with a reduced percentage from the 2004 election.

On December 16, 2004, MP Lawrence O'Brien died of cancer, the next year Prime Minister Paul Martin called a by-election for May 24, 2005. There was a possibility the by-election would not be held because of a non-confidence vote the week prior. The non-confidence vote would have toppled the government sending Canadians to the polls, which would have superseded the by-election.  However, the motion failed by one vote, ensuring the by-election.

The seat has traditionally been a Liberal stronghold, and O'Brien always carried the riding with comfortable pluralities.  However, the federal Liberals had lost popularity in Atlantic Canada since the 2004 federal election largely because of disputes with the Progressive Conservative provincial governments of these provinces, especially that of Newfoundland and Labrador over the relationship between offshore oil revenues and equalization payments.

Historically, governing parties fare poorly in federal by-elections. However, this by-election was especially significant because of the make-up of the 38th Canadian Parliament. Following the 2004 election, the Liberals and the New Democratic Party held 154 seats together, or exactly half of the 308-seat House of Commons. After Liberal MP Carolyn Parrish was expelled from that party, the two parties' combined total (prior to O'Brien's death) had been reduced to 153 (or 152 who are eligible to vote since the Speaker was elected as a Liberal). The Liberals were anxious to retain the seat, as its loss would have left the opposition Conservative Party of Canada or the Bloc Québécois as the only viable partners for the Liberals to get legislation passed in the House. Former Liberal MP David Kilgour had left the party, further reducing its strength.

Since the general election, it had been suggested that the New Democratic Party refrain from contesting by-elections in seats where the Liberals were strong but the NDP are not, to avoid splitting the vote and thus help improve the chances securing a better position for the NDP in the House. Labrador would certainly be a prime example of such a seat — the NDP finished a distant fourth in the 2004 election. However, historically the NDP has been adamant in contesting all by-elections, and NDP leader Jack Layton showed little interest in any such proposal. The NDP nominated Frances Fry on April 23 feeling it had a chance in this seat because of the Liberal fall in polls and the fact that the provincial NDP had one of its two seats in Labrador.

In the end, the Liberals picked up an easy victory, as expected, but while their actual vote total did not go down by much, their percentage of the vote went down over 10 points from the previous election as turnout was over 9% more than in the 2004 election. This high turnout is virtually unheard of for by-elections which normally have extremely poor turnouts. The additional voters appear to have been brought out by the tense national political situation and mostly voted for the Conservatives who picked up nearly 17 percentage points and the New Democrats who also increased their vote total.

Members of Parliament

This riding has elected the following Members of Parliament:

Election results

Labrador

2021 general election

2019 general election

2015 general election

2013 by-election

2011 general election

2008 general election

2006 general election

2005 by-election

2004 general election

2000 general election

1997 general election

1996 by-election

1993 general election

1988 general election

Grand Falls—White Bay—Labrador

1984 general election

1980 general election

1979 general election

1974 general election

1972 general election

1968 general election

1966 by-election

1965 general election

1963 general election

1962 general election

1958 general election

1957 general election

1953 general election

Grand Falls—White Bay

1949 general election

Student Vote Results

2019

2015

2011

See also
 List of Canadian federal electoral districts
 Past Canadian electoral districts

References

Notes

External links
  from Elections Canada
 Riding history for Grand Falls—White Bay (1949–1952) from the Library of Parliament
 Riding history for Grand Falls—White Bay—Labrador (1952–1987) from the Library of Parliament
 Riding history for Labrador (1987– ) from the Library of Parliament
 Election Financial Reports from Elections Canada

Newfoundland and Labrador federal electoral districts
Labrador